Ndialou Paye (born 29 January 1974 in Dakar, Senegal) is a Senegalese former basketball player who competed in the 2000 Summer Olympics.

References

1974 births
Living people
Basketball players from Dakar
Senegalese women's basketball players
Olympic basketball players of Senegal
Basketball players at the 2000 Summer Olympics